Hans-Joachim Bremermann (1926–1996) was a German-American mathematician and biophysicist. He worked on computer science and evolution, introducing ideas of how mating generates new gene combinations. Bremermann's limit, named after him, is the maximum computational speed of a self-contained system in the material universe.

Early life 
Bremermann was born in Bremen, Germany, to Bernard Bremermann and Berta Wicke. 

Bremermann undertook doctoral studies at the University of Münster, completing his Staatsexamen in mathematics and physics in 1951. In the same year his doctoral dissertation Die Charakterisierung von Regularitätsgebieten durch pseudokonvexe Funktionen and was to become a specialist in complex analysis. This was a special case of the Levi problem.

Career 
He came to the United States in 1952 to a research associate position at Stanford University. In 1953, he was appointed a research fellow at Harvard University.

He returned to Munster for 1954–55. After returning to the United States, he spent 1955–57 at the Institute for Advanced Study in Princeton. He was then appointed assistant professor at the University of Washington, Seattle for 1957–58.

He held chairs at the University of California, Berkeley in mathematics and biophysics. 

He was promoted to full professor in 1966.

In 1978 he gave the "What Physicists Do" series of lectures at Sonoma State University, discussing physical limitations to mathematical understanding of physical and biological systems.

He continued work in mathematical biology through the 1980s on models of parasites and disease, neural networks, and AIDS epidemiology and pathology.

Personal life 
On 16 May 1954 Bremermann married Maria Isabel Lopez Perez-Ojeda, a scholar of romance language and literature. 

== Legacy ==
R.W. Anderson writes:

[Bremermann] continued to develop mathematical modelling as a tool to understanding complex (especially biological) systems for the rest of his life. His intellectual journey was marked by brilliant insight and foresight.

He retired from the University of California in 1991. A festschrift was published with a brief biography and 13 scientific papers of his former students and colleagues in 1995 in a special issue of BioSystems.

See also
Bremermann's limit
Transcomputational problem

References

External links
"Hans Joachim Bremermann" at the MacTutor History of Mathematics archive
The UC Berkeley Obituary

1926 births
1996 deaths
University of Münster alumni
German emigrants to the United States
Harvard Fellows
Stanford University staff
University of Washington faculty
University of California, Berkeley College of Letters and Science faculty
Scientists from Bremen
20th-century German mathematicians